The Port de la Lune (Port of the Moon) is the name given to the harbour of Bordeaux, dating to the Middle Ages, because of the shape of the river crossing the city. It is represented by a crescent on the coat of arms of Bordeaux, and by three interlaced crescents in the logotype of the municipality.

In 2007, the Port of the Moon and roughly 1800 hectares of the surrounding urban area were listed a UNESCO World Heritage Site  because of its outstanding and "innovative classical and neoclassical architectural trends" and Bordeaux's prominence as both the center of the historical wine industry and as a global trading center for more than 800 years. The World Heritage Site is the largest urban area inscribed by UNESCO (as of 2021), covering roughly 40% of the entire city's area.

UNESCO has also rewarded the municipality for its efforts to restore and embellish quays and facades of the city center, including the Place de la Bourse, Miroir d'eau, and the Grand-Théâtre.

Gallery

References 

World Heritage Sites in France
Buildings and structures in Bordeaux
Tourist attractions in Bordeaux